Pakistan sent a delegation to compete at the 2008 Summer Paralympics in Beijing, China. Haider Ali created history by winning a silver medal, the country's first at any Paralympics. The delegation was also rocked by a doping scandal, when its powerlifter, Naveed Ahmed Butt was banned for testing positive, the first athlete at the games.

Medallists
The country won one medal, a silver.

Sports

Athletics

Men's track

Men's field

Women's field

Powerlifting

See also
Pakistan at the Paralympics
Pakistan at the 2008 Summer Olympics

External links
 Haider Ali
 Nadia Hafeez
Nasir Butt
Naveed Ahmed Butt
Raheel Anwar
Shahzad Javed
International Paralympic Committee
Haider wins Pakistan’s first Paralympics medal
Pakistan start Paralympics campaign in Beijing tomorrow

References 

Nations at the 2008 Summer Paralympics
2008
Summer Paralympics